Kyunki Saas Bhi Kabhi Bahu Thi ( Because mother-in-law was also daughter-in-law once) is an Indian Hindi-language soap opera that aired from 4 July 2000 to 7 November 2008 on Star Plus.  The show was co-produced by Shobha Kapoor and Ekta Kapoor under their banner Balaji Telefilms.

The show revolved around an ideal daughter-in-law, the daughter of a pandit married to the grandson of rich business tycoon Govardhan Virani. The role of  Tulsi Virani was played by Smriti Irani.

Plot

Set in Mumbai, the series focuses on the wealthy Gujarati Virani family where the three daughters-in-law, Savita, Daksha and Gayatri, control the whole family and create trouble for their wise and kind-hearted mother-in-law Amba. Savita fixes her son, Mihir's, marriage to the arrogant Payal, but he falls in love with and marries the family priest's daughter Tulsi. The Viranis accept Tulsi, who eventually also wins over Savita and has a son, Gautam. Mihir meets with an accident and is presumed dead.

Mihir survives but loses his memory. His caretaker, Dr. Mandira falls in love with him. Her brother Anupam proposes to Tulsi, who agrees but cancels their marriage when Mihir turns out to be alive. He regains his memory. Mandira fakes being pregnant with his child. Tulsi becomes pregnant again. Payal conspires against the Viranis, but is exposed. Tulsi gives Gautam to Mihir's brother, Kiran, and his wife, Aarti, who are childless. Tulsi delivers a daughter, Shobha. Aarti and Kiran leave India with Gautam.

20 years later

Tulsi and Mihir have another son, Harsh. Gautam returns with Kiran and Aarti, who now have a daughter Karishma. Gautam learns about his birth parents. Tulsi wants him to marry Ganga, but Gautam weds his own love, Teesha. Gautam's cousin, Sahil, marries Ganga while Shobha marries Vishal. Teesha and her unborn child dies in an accident planned by Mandira that was meant for Tulsi.

Gautam remarries Damini, who is later pregnant at the same time as Ganga. Ganga miscarries, and Damini delivers twins, Mayank and Nakul. Damini and Gautam give Nakul to Sahil and Ganga. Vishal dies, making Shobha widowed. Harsh turns out to be Tulsi's cousin, Kesar's son. Kesar has switched Harsh with Tulsi's real son, Ansh who was then raised by Aditya Gujral. Back to present, Ansh is obsessed with Nandini.

Tulsi accepts Mihir and Mandira's son, Karan, who loves her more than Mandira. Though Karan and Nandini are in love, he gets her married to Ansh who maritally rapes her. Lawyer and Tulsi's friend Meera Singhania becomes fond of Mihir. Tulsi shoots Ansh to death as he tries to kill Nandini, who delivers her and Ansh's daughter, Bhoomi before lapsing into a coma. Karan marries his friend Tanya to care for Bhoomi. Ganga and Sahil have a son, Lakshya.

3 years later

Tanya is pregnant, but hasn't told Karan about the pregnancy. Nandini wakes up from the coma and lives with Karan. Shobha leaves Vishal learning he and Rathi killed Vishal. Nandini, who is pregnant, kills Aditya to save Bhoomi from kidnapping and gets jailed for 14 years. Tanya delivers a son, Manthan. Gautam adopts Eklavya, Ansh and his first wife Shraddha's son. Sahil falls in love with Tripti. Meera falls for Mihir and conspires with Mandira against Tulsi. Savita vows to expose them but meets with an accident planned by them. Being paralyzed, she asks Tulsi to unplug her life support and dies. Meera makes Mihir to believe that Tulsi killed Savita. Believing her, Mihir throws Tulsi out of the house who is later presumed to be dead in a bus accident although Tulsi got out of the bus before the accident to take a fellow passenger to the hospital. The Viranis' are left devastated and Mihir becomes an alcoholic blaming himself for Tulsi's death. Tulsi misses Mihir and decides to go back home but sees Meera hugging Mihir and assumes that they're having an affair. Tulsi heads to Haridwar to kill herself by drowning in the river. Before she could do so, she sees a newborn child being abandoned by her father. Tulsi saves the child and decides to raise her naming her Krishna Tulsi.

20 years later

Tulsi's grandchildren are grown-up. Tulsi lives in Haridwar with a grownup  Krishna Tulsi. Krishna comes to Mumbai for her education. Tanya and Karan get divorced. Nandini returns and Karan remarries her. Karan-Nandini tries to find their lost son, but fails. Sahil divorces Tripti realizing her true intentions and marries Ganga. Tulsi returns and unites with the Viranis, Meera is exposed and imprisoned for Savita's murder. Though Krishna Tulsi and Laksh are in love but she marries Eklavya, who is a lookalike of his father Ansh. Baa dies leaving the entire inheritance to an unknown person in her will. In the final episode, Tulsi's best friend, Parvati Agarwal meets up with Tulsi and reveals that she has brought up Parth (Karan and Nandini's long lost son), who has inherited Baa's property.

Cast

Main
 Smriti Irani as Tulsi Mihir Virani – Virani priest's elder daughter; Kesar's sister; Mihir's wife; Gautam, Shobha and Ansh's mother; Karan and Harsh's adoptive mother; Eklavya, Mayank, Nakul, Pushkar, Bhoomi and Pari's grandmother; Manthan, Parth and Archita's adoptive grandmother. (2000-2008) 
 Amar Upadhyay / Inder Kumar / Ronit Roy as Mihir Virani – Mansukh and Savita's elder son; Kiran's brother; Tulsi's husband; Gautam, Shobha, Karan and Ansh's father; Harsh's adoptive father; Eklavya, Mayank, Nakul, Pushkar, Bhoomi, Pari, Manthan and Parth's grandfather; Archita's adoptive grandfather. (2000-2002)/(2003)/(2003-2008) 
 Dinesh Thakur / Sudhir Dalvi as Govardhan Virani – Amba's husband; Mansukh, Himmat, Jamnadas and Pragya's father; Mihir, Kiran, Chirag, Suhasi, Hemant, Sejal and Vikram's grandfather. (2000-2001)/(2002)(Dead) 
 Sudha Shivpuri as Amba Virani – Govardhan's widow; Mansukh, Himmat, Jamnadas and Pragya's mother; Mihir, Kiran, Chirag, Suhasi, Hemant, Sejal and Vikram's grandmother. (2000-2008)(Dead) 
 Mandira Bedi / Achint Kaur as Dr. Mandira Gujral – Anupam's sister; Mihir's doctor and lover; Aditya's widow; Karan's mother; Manthan and Parth's grandmother.
 Jaya Bhattacharya as Payal Mehra – Mihir's ex-fiancée; Pratap's wife; Vishal and Urvashi's mother; Pushkar's grandmother.
 Shakti Singh as Mansukh Virani – Govardhan and Amba's eldest son; Himmat, Jamnadas and Pragya's brother; Savita's husband; Mihir and Kiran's father; Gautam, Shobha, Karan, Ansh and Karishma's grandfather. (Dead)
 Apara Mehta as Savita Mansukh Virani – Mansukh's wife; Mihir and Kiran's mother; Gautam, Shobha, Karan, Ansh and Karishma's grandmother. (Dead)
 Sumeet Sachdev as Gautam "Gomzy" Virani – Tulsi and Mihir's elder son; Kiran and Aarti's adoptive son; Shobha and Ansh's brother; Karan's half-brother; Harsh and Karishma's adoptive brother; Teesha's widower; Damini's husband; Mayank and Nakul's father; Eklavya's adoptive father.
 Riva Bubber / Ravee Gupta as Damini Joshi Virani – Gautam's wife; Mayank and Nakul's mother; Eklavya's adoptive mother.
 Rahul Lohani as Mayank Virani – Gautam and Damini's elder son; Nakul's brother; Eklavya's adoptive brother. 
 Naman Shaw as Nakul Virani – Gautam and Damini's younger son; Sahil and Ganga's adoptive son; Mayank's brother; Lakshaya and Joydeep's adoptive brother; Sanchi's husband.
 Kratika Sengar / Anita Hassanandani as Sanchi Virani – Nakul's wife.
 Ritu Chaudhary as Shobha Virani Choudhary – Tulsi and Mihir's daughter; Gautam and Ansh's sister; Karan's half-sister; Harsh's adoptive sister; Vishal's widow; Abhishek's wife; Pushkar and Pari's mother.
 Palak Jain as Child Shobha Virani.
 Vivan Bhatena / Nasir Khan as Abhishek Choudhary – Shobha's second husband; Pari's father.
 Rohit Bakshi as Vishal Mehra – Payal and Pratap's son; Urvashi's brother; Shobha's first husband; Pushkar's father. (Dead)
 Garima Bhatnagar as Pari Choudhary – Shobha and Abhishek's daughter; Pushkar's half-sister.
 Hiten Tejwani as Karan Virani – Mihir and Mandira's son; Tulsi's adoptive son; Gautam, Shobha and Ansh's half-brother; Harsh's adoptive brother; Tanya's ex-husband; Nandini's husband; Manthan and Parth's father; Bhoomi's adoptive father.
 Gauri Pradhan Tejwani as Nandini Thakkar Virani – Ansh's ex-wife; Karan's wife; Bhoomi and Parth's mother. 
 Rakshanda Khan as Tanya Malhotra – Kaushalya's daughter; Karan's ex-wife; Manthan's mother; Bhoomi's adoptive mother.
 Akashdeep Saigal as 
 Ansh Virani – Tulsi and Mihir's younger son; Aditya's adoptive son; Gautam and Shobha's brother; Karan's half-brother; Harsh's adoptive brother; Shraddha and Nandini's ex-husband; Eklavya and Bhoomi's father. (Dead)
 Eklavya Virani – Shraddha and Ansh's son; Gautam and Damini's adoptive son; Bhoomi's half-brother; Mayank's adoptive brother; Krishna Tulsi's husband.
 Amey Pandya as Child Eklavya Virani
 Mouni Roy as Krishna Tulsi Virani – Tulsi's namesake daughter; Eklavya's wife. 
 Reshmi Ghosh as Bhoomi Virani – Nandini and Ansh's daughter; Karan and Tanya's adoptive daughter; Eklavya and Parth's half-sister; Manthan's adoptive sister; Joydeep's wife. 
 Chinky Jaiswal as Child Bhoomi Virani.
 Manav Vij as Joydeep Virani – Sahil and Tripti's son; Ganga's adoptive son; Lakshaya's half-brother; Nakul's adoptive brother; Bhoomi's husband.
 Amit Tandon / Vishal Watwani / Amit Tandon as Manthan Virani – Karan and Tanya's son; Parth's half-brother; Bhoomi's adoptive brother. 
 Mehul Kajaria as Harsh Virani – Tulsi and Mihir's  son-younger brother of Gautam,Karan, Sahil,  and Shobha.elder brother of Ansh,and Tulsi.Mohini's husband; Archita's father.
 Tassnim Sheikh as Mohini Virani – Harsh's wife; Archita's mother.
 Jiten Lalwani as Kiran Virani – Mansukh and Savita's younger son; Mihir's brother; Aarti's ex-husband; Karishma's father; Gautam's adoptive father.
 Eva Grover / Rushali Arora as Aarti Virani – Kiran's ex-wife; Karishma's mother; Gautam's adoptive mother.
 Kiran Dubey as Karishma Virani Dey – Aarti and Kiran's daughter; Gautam's adoptive sister; Shantanu's wife. 
 Narendra Jha as Shantanu Dey – Karishma's husband
 Jitendra Trehan as Himmat Virani – Govardhan and Amba's second son; Daksha's husband; Mansukh, Jamnadas and Pragya's brother; Chirag and Suhasi's father; Savri, Bavri, Hitesh, Tushar and Aniket's grandfather
 Ketki Dave as Daksha Virani – Himmat's wife; Chirag and Suhasi's mother; Savri, Bavri, Hitesh, Tushar and Aniket's grandmother
 Hussain Kuwajerwala / Amit Mistry as Chirag Virani – Himmat and Daksha's son; Suhasi's brother; Prajakta's husband; Savri, Bavri and Hitesh's father
 Tuhina Vohra as Prajakta Virani – Chirag's wife; Savri, Bavri and Hitesh's mother
 Masumi Mevawala as Child Savri Virani
 Amita Chandekar as Bavri Virani – Chirag and Prajakta's younger daughter; Savri and Hitesh's sister
 Hansika Motwani / Chandni Bhagwanani as Child Bavri Virani
 Aditya Kapadia as Hitesh Virani – Chirag and Prajakta's son; Savri and Bavri's brother
 Pooja Ghai Rawal as Suhasi Virani Mehta – Daksha and Himmat's daughter; Chirag's sister; Rakesh's wife; Tushar and Aniket's mother
 Prashant Bhatt as Rakesh Mehta – Suhasi's husband; Tushar and Aniket's father
 Shabbir Ahluwalia as Aniket Mehta – Rakesh's son; Suhasi's step-son; Tushar's half-brother
 Karanvir Bohra / Pradeep Kharab / Sameer Sharma as Tushar Mehta – Rakesh and Suhasi's son; Aniket's half-brother; Kanika's husband
 Gunjan Walia as Kanika Virani – Tushar's wife
 Muni Jha as Jamnadas Virani – Amba and Govardhan's youngest son; Mansukh, Himmat and Pragya's brother; Gayatri's husband; Hemant and Sejal's father; Tarun and Sahil's grandfather
 Kamalika Guha Thakurta as Gayatri Virani – Jamnadas's wife; Hemant and Sejal's mother; Tarun and Sahil's grandmother
 Shakti Anand as Hemant Virani – Jamnadas and Gayatri's son; Sejal's brother; Pooja's husband; Tarun and Sahil's father; Lakshya and Joydeep's grandfather
 Prachi Shah as Pooja Virani – Hemant's wife; Tarun and Sahil's mother; Lakshya and Joydeep's grandmother
 Sandeep Baswana / Amit Sarin as Sahil Virani – Hemant and Pooja's younger son; Tarun's brother; Tripti's ex-husband; Ganga's husband; Lakshaya and Joydeep's father; Nakul's adoptive father. 
 Shilpa Saklani as Ganga Virani – Sahil's wife; Lakshya's mother; Nakul and Joydeep's adoptive mother.
 Abhijit Khurana / Alok Arora as Tarun Virani – Hemant and Pooja's elder son; Sahil's brother. 
 Suvarna Jha as Tripti Virani – Sahil's ex-wife; Joydeep's mother
 Pulkit Samrat / Yash Pandit as Lakshya Virani – Ganga and Sahil's son; Joydeep's half-brother; Nakul's adoptive brother; Vaidehi's husband. 
 Tia Bajpai as Vaidehi Virani – Lakshya's wife

Recurring

Production

Directors
Kyunki was directed by many directors starting with Kaushik Ghatak who initially directed the series for 150 episodes. As it progressed, it was directed by Ashish Patil, Nivedita Basu, Suraj Rao, Santosh Badal, Dharmesh Shah, Santram Varma, Santosh Bhatt, Garry Bhinder, Deepak Chavan, Sanotsh Bhatt, Fahad Kashmiri, Avhiroop Mazzumdar, Jeetu Arora, Santosh Kolhe, Vicky Chauhan, Rohit Dwivedi, Deepak Sharma, Shyam Maheshwari, Talat Jani, Hitesh Tejwani, Anoop Chaudhary and V.G Roy.

Development
The shooting of the serial began on 7 April 2000. On 13 April 2005, the serial completed 1000 episodes which aired for 45 minutes rather than usual 30 minutes where producer Ekta Kapoor herself was seen in the episode. Aksahdeep Saigal's entry scene in 2004 as Ansh Gujral was the serial's costliest scene shot which cost about Rs. 5 Lakhs.

The show took a leap in story three times including 20 years leap on 18 February 2002, followed by a 3 years leap and again a 20 years leap on 7 June 2006.

Before its premiere, the serial's name was Amma, but actor and director Sachin Philgaonkar gave it the name Saas Bhi Kabhi Bahu Thi to Balaji Telefilms. Kyunki was added to the beginning of the name by Ekta Kapoor.

Besides shooting in India, the series was also shot in foreign locations including Sydney, Australia in 2003 and Switzerland. In India the series was filmed at Mumbai's Powai, Kandivali, Film City at Goregaon.

In 2007 and 2008, the series had a crossover with Kahaani Ghar Ghar Kii.

Casting

The character Mihir was named after Ekta Kapoor's school friend Mihir Shah. The character Tulsi was adopted from Harkishan Mehta's work, Jad Chetan.

Earlier, Jignesh Gandhi was cast as Mihir. However, later the role came down for Amar Upadhyay and Cezzane Khan. Upadhyay was chosen while Khan went for Kasautii Zindagii Kay. Smiti Irani auditioning among many girls was initially declined by the team in the production house stating her as 'not fit for TV'. But, producer Ekta Kapoor overruled them and cast her as Tulsi having great faith in her.

After Amar Upadhyay quit in 2001, after the death of his character, nationwide protests made him return. In 2002, on a generation leap, Upadhyay quit to venture into Bollywood and was replaced by Inder Kumar. After Kumar quit in later that year, he was replaced by Ronit Roy as Mihir who played the role until the end.

In June 2007, Smriti Irani playing Tulsi quit the serial as she was busy producing her serials and was replaced by Gautami Kapoor. Soon, in April 2008, Irani returned and Kapoor's character was revealed as Tulsi's imposter.

Cancellation
On 10 October 2008, a notice was sent to the production house by the channel to terminate the serial by 10 November 2008 stating the declining ratings since July 2008.

To save the series from cancellation, the production house took Star TV to Bombay High Court seeking for the stay order asserting that they had a contract through March 2009 and that the channel had not provided appropriate promotion while the channel pointed out the cancellation due to declining ratings as per agreement. The court refused the stay order and the claims were dismissed on 3 November 2008. The series went off air on 6 November 2008.

Reception

Critics
Shailaja Bajpai from The Indian Express said, "Kyunki...'s success was due to the fact that it was a universal story that appealed to everyone. It was a winning combination of piety and family. The show celebrated all the big festivals, it was all packaged very well, there was drama and melodrama."

Another report from The Indian Express praising on the ratings delivered during its airing time slot said, "While prime-time television viewing is between 8 to 11 pm, the 9 to 10 pm block was considered safe because it delivered better ratings during the days of the weeklies. But the rule of game changed with Kyunki Saas Bhi Kabhi Bahu Thi and Kahanii Ghar Ghar Kii which made the late prime-time (10 to 11 pm) extremely popular." The ratings delivered by this series in its slot was not achieved by any other shows launched after its off airing.

The Tribune comparing women depiction in the series with some of the Star World English series stated, "The women in Ally McBeal or Friends are nothing like those in Kahaani Ghar... or Kyunki.... Professionally competent, in control of their lives they are not to be held back by any stereotypical demands made on them. Perhaps one of the reasons for its (Kyunki...) success is the strong element of empathy it evokes.... what it depicts is probably kahaani ghar ghar ki (The story of every house)."

Ratings
Produced with the backdrop of Mumbai and the concept of an ideal Gujarati joint family, the show made Producer Ekta Kapoor and Star Plus achieve great heights of success, by not only being the number 1 show on Indian Television which ran for eight constant long years, but also receiving great TRPs.

It was the consistently most watched Hindi GEC overall until 2005 and the following years maintained its positions consistently in top five television programs.

Until five weeks after its premiere, the ratings did not languish. After that, it started to rise gradually and also became the second most watched Hindi show of 2000 after Kaun Banega Crorepati with an average TRP of 6.4. In 2001, it averaged 12.04 TVR. In 2002 and 2003, it had an average of 12.50 and 12.30 TVR while in 2004 it was 11.42 TVR with a peak of 19.41 TVR maintaining its top position mostly with its higher ratings.

In March 2001, the series garnered its all-time high ratings of 22.4 TVR when the lead character Mihir returned to life on popular demand and protests. In week during 7 May to 13 May 2001, it was at first position with 16.6 TVR. On 24 May 2001, it garnered 14.7 TVR. On the week ending 26 September 2001, it topped the TRP list with 18.8 TVR. From 14 October to 20 October 2001 it garnered 12.74 TVR while during the same time in the next year 2002, it garnered 9.84 TVR.

In third week of August 2002, it maintained its top position garnering 15.9 TVR.

On week ending 22 November 2003, it was the most watched with 10.1 TVR.

In 2005, it remained the most watched Hindi show however with about 10 TVR garnered lesser than previous years. As months passed, the TVR of the series decreased from double digits to single digit after 2006 due to fragmentation in viewership, however mostly maintaining its top position until months before its end. In week ending 1 March 2006, it maintained its top position garnering 9 TVR. It achieved its highest ratings of 14.17, 14.31 and 13 TVR on 31 July 2006, 29 August 2006 and 4 September 2006 during the year.

During the second week of January 2007, it garnered 6.3 TVR. In early March 2007, it garnered 4 TVR while in early June, it got 4.4 TVR. The sequence of Irani as Tulsi shown killed when she quit before being temporarily replaced by Gautami Kapoor made the ratings to increase to 7.81 and 8.09 TVR before which it was getting about 6 TVR in that year, maintaining its position in top 5 programs. After Irani was replaced by Gautami Kapoor as Tulsi in June 2007, the TVR dropped while it lost its number one position averaging 4.5 TVR while in that month it averaged 6.66 TVR overall. On 21 July 2007, it dropped to 5.3 TVR. Towards the last week in September 2007, it was beaten by Banoo Main Teri Dulhann with Kyunki... garnering 5.51 TVR and Banoo... getting 5.62 TVR. However overall, it was one of the top rated series of the year with its rating garnered less than the previous years.

In early 2008, Kyunki... had an average of 5 TVR, being one of the most watched series while on progressing it dropped to 2.5 TVR months before its end which made the channel to axe the series. As in week 17 of 2008, it garnered 5.5 TVR. In week ending 9 August 2008, it garnered 2.51 TVR occupying twentieth position. The final episode garnered 5.4 million viewership.

Accolades
The show also went on to receive several awards, most of which were won by Smriti Irani for her portrayal of the ideal character Tulsi. It also won Best Continuing Series at Indian Telly Awards for six consecutive years (2002-2007) and won Best Serial (Popular) for five consecutive years (2001-2005) at Indian Television Academy Awards.

The show is the longest ran daily soap on Indian television during the 2000s, running from 2000 to 2008 and completing 1833 episodes and was first Indian soap opera to cross 1000 episodes in the history of Indian Television and also entered the Limca Book of Records.

Impact
The death of the lead character Mihir Virani in early 2001 lead to fan protest marches to bring the character back. The return of Mihir Virani in March 2001 brought an all-time high rating of 22.4 TVR, despite airing at late night slot of 10:30 pm (IST), which has been one of the highest rating ever achieved by an Indian serial.

In January 2001, despite the earthquake occurred in Gujarat, people put their television for watching this series.

In February 2003, The Times of India reported that the people started recreating the grand sets of the series in their homes at Kolkata.

In 2001, a conflict arouse between Star India and the production house over the Tamil series titled Kelunga Mamiyare Neengalum Marumagal Than (trans. Listen mother in law, You were also a daughter in law) which began airing from April 2001 on Sun TV. While Star stated it as an exact copy of this series violating the copyright without their knowledge, Balaji Telefilms pointed only little similarities with the title meaning and the lead character name being similar. CEO of Balaji Telefilms Sanjay Doshi stated that the script of the Tamil series was already changed after episode 15.

In September 2001, the series was blacked out in Saurashtra when Rajputs protested for naming a dog in the series with the name of the Saint Jalamsinh Jadeja. Soon, it was sorted out when Balaji Telefilms apologized for it stating it unintentional.

In January 2002, the company Procter & Gamble, for advertising their detergent brand Tide aired the spoof version of the series consisting of the cast Smriti Irani, Aparna Mehta and Muni Jha of the series which was telecast on a rival channel. Both Star and Balaji Telefilms reported it as a copyright violation considering the advertisement which uses the same sets, backdrop, announcement fonts and music along with the cast of the series. Star filed a case against Leo Burnett (Star India v Leo Burnett) and the case was heard before Bombay court in 2003.

In February 2002, Brihanmumbai Municipal Corporation lodged a FIR at Andheri police station against Star TV and Balaji Telefilms when the episode aired on 5 February 2002 showed the character Puja undergoing pre sex determination test of her unborn child and also the doctor encouraging her for the child being a son. As per Pre-natal Diagnostic Technology (Regulation & Prevention of Misuse) Act of 1994, the test is illegal which was violated by the series. Many NGOs and state women organisation also protested against the episode sequence. However, both Kapoor and Star asked apology for portraying it for which Kapoor said, "It was not intentional. There was a slight lapse on the part of the writer of the script." while Star stated it as a genuine mistake and apologised in a subsequent episode.

In November 2004, Kapoor was summoned by National Commission for Women and even Star was sent a notice following complaints from many women groups for showing a marital rape sequence of character Nandhini by Ansh Gunral for 15 minutes in the episode aired on 14 October 2004 claiming it more sensitive considering the viewership of the series by all age groups. Kapoor's lawyer stated that they will appear on 1 December 2004, along with a copy of the episode to submit to them, while channel defended that they were mindful of their programs and they are for general viewing. However, when Kapoor failed to appear on that day, sending her two lawyers to represent her, the case was adjourned for Kapoor's appearance on 14 December 2004. However, on her demand, it was further adjourned to 3 January 2005.

It was dubbed in Dari language and was aired on Tolo TV in Afghanistan since 2005 becoming the first Indian television series to air there and gained huge popularity. But it was soon banned along with all other Indian series aired then in 2008 with many complaints raising over them.

In January 2006, protests in front of Balaji Telefilms office at Andheri took place against the depicted scene of mercy killing, which was illegal then in India, of character Savitha done by the lead character Tulsi in the series. However Kapoor stated, "I dealt with marital rape in Kyunki…, didn't I? Then why can't I show euthanasia? TV is fiction and we are only bringing up social issues. If there is any problem, my legal department will take care of it." while Star India's senior creative director Shailaja Kejriwal stated, "We at Star, along with Balaji Telefilms, have decided to take up (through the serials) social issues that are not talked about openly. We just though that euthanasia is a subject of great importance… we should talk about it and keep the topic alive." Smriti Irani playing Tulsi who did the mercy killing of character Aparna said that she doesn't support mercy killing while she, who was uncomfortable for doing it, said that she did the sequence considering that she would have been labelled as an unprofessional actor.

In January 2008, the dialogue "You and your God, go to hell" pointing against lord Vishnu deity in an episode said by the antagonist Suvarna Jha playing Tripti hurted the sentiments of many people and Vaishnav community. Protests and rally arouse at Junagadh lead by the priests and various Vaishnav followers who also submitted a memo to the district collector for Balaji Telefilms, Producer Ekta Kapoor and Suvarna Jha to apologise for it. Many also criticised it as a move for increasing ratings. However, Kapoor stated that it was not their intention and they also being having Vishnu faith, requested apology from everyone.

In February 2008, Pulkit Samrat playing Lakshya got a notice from court stating his non absence for shooting and no response for phone calls from production house which was filed by the production house while Samrat stated that he attended the shoots regularly but was idle for most of the time with inconsequential  scenes and so wished to work alongside. on other series. The problem arouse when he earlier complained to the production house for non payment of his dues and their contract which doesnot permit him to work for other production houses. The notice was received after these incidents after which he went to court and was relieved from the series and production house after the verdict.

In 2009, the series was criticised glorifying social evils along with few other Indian television shows during the discussions in the Indian Parliament.

Acknowledging the impact of some of her shows including Kyunki..., Ekta Kapoor stated, "They were heavily stylised and melodramatic. But they actually gave Indian women a voice. There's research that shows that after cable penetration, from about 2001 to 2005, which is when my shows ran, India, for the first time, saw women take decisions on family issues. This had never happened before, and it was directly linked to the fact that we made the women in our shows do this."

Adaptations
It was remade during 2007 in Tamil language in Sri Lanka.

Awards

Indian Telly Awards

Indian Television Academy Awards

Others

See also

 Star India v Leo Burnett: a court case involving the claim that a commercial imitating the show violated copyright law.

References

External links
 Kyunki Saas Bhi Kabhi Bahu Thi on Disney+ Hotstar
 

Balaji Telefilms television series
Indian television soap operas
StarPlus original programming
2000 Indian television series debuts
2008 Indian television series endings
Television shows set in Gujarat